Patricio Guillermo (Pat) Herbst is an educator and mathematician. He is professor of education and mathematics at the University of Michigan, and editor-designate of Journal for Research in Mathematics Education, a peer-reviewed journal.  He has been chair of the University of Michigan's Educational Studies Program since September 2015. Herbst received his Master of Arts and Ph.D. from the University of Georgia. He has an h-index of 29.

References

External links

Curriculum vitae

LessonSketch

University of Michigan faculty
University of Georgia alumni
20th-century American mathematicians
Year of birth missing (living people)
Living people
21st-century American mathematicians